Nososticta pilbara is a species of Australian damselfly in the family Platycnemididae,
commonly known as a Pilbara threadtail. 
It has only been found in the Pilbara region of Western Australia, where it inhabits streams and pools.

Nososticta pilbara is a small, slender damselfly, black in colour with orange markings.

Gallery

See also
 List of Odonata species of Australia

References 

Platycnemididae
Odonata of Australia
Insects of Australia
Endemic fauna of Australia
Taxa named by J.A.L. (Tony) Watson
Insects described in 1969
Damselflies